Cultural Ministers Council was an intergovernmental organisation for ministers of culture and the arts.

It was established in 1984 by the Prime Minister of Australia, Premiers of the Australian states and the Chief Minister of the Northern Territory.  The Australian Capital Territory became a full member in 1990 as a consequence of being granted full self-governance with the passing of Australian Capital Territory (Self-Government) Act 1988. New Zealand became a full member in 1991 after previously having observer status. Australian Local Government Association, Norfolk Island and Papua New Guinea had observer status.

The council operated under the Broad Protocols and General Principles for the Operation of Ministerial Councils defined by the Council of Australian Governments.

The Cultural Ministers Council has not met since 2011:

References

Sources

External links 
  (2007-2011)
  (1999-2007)

Government of Australia
Government agencies established in 1984
Australian culture